Tamer Hakan Tuna (born 19 October 1991 in England) is a Turkish footballer who plays as a striker. He is currently a free agent after a short spell at Kent League side Erith Town.

Career
Tuna, who went to Chislehurst and Sidcup Grammar School in Sidcup, joined Charlton Athletic at the age of nine, after a short spell playing for local youth club Parkwood Rangers. He plays as a striker. He made his first team debut for Charlton in a 2–2 draw against Blackpool on 18 April 2009, which confirmed their relegation to League One. Tuna was handed the 28 shirt for the 2009–10 shirt and has seen himself on goal scoring form for the reserves and having a few substitute appearances for the first team. He made his full debut against Barnet on 6 October 2009 in the Football League Trophy, marking his debut with a 40th-minute goal.

Tuna went on a work experience loan to Conference South club Staines Town in January 2010, featuring three times for the club. Later that month, he left Staines and went on loan to another Conference South club, Woking. On 19 March 2010, Tuna was then loaned to fellow Conference South play-off contenders Welling United. Tuna then went on to have further loan spells at Thurrock and Aveley.

Tuna remained on a YTS contract for Charlton Athletic during 2010. However, he was released by the club in May 2011.

He subsequently appeared for Welling United, Cray Wanderers, Hastings United and Erith Town.

References

External links

Tamer Tuna profile at the Charlton Athletic website

Living people
1991 births
Footballers from Bexley
People educated at Chislehurst and Sidcup Grammar School
Association football forwards
Turkish footballers
English footballers
English people of Turkish descent
Charlton Athletic F.C. players
Staines Town F.C. players
Woking F.C. players
Thurrock F.C. players
Aveley F.C. players
Welling United F.C. players
Bromley F.C. players
Erith Town F.C. players
English Football League players
National League (English football) players
Isthmian League players
Cray Wanderers F.C. players
Hastings United F.C. players